Victoria Angela Harden is an American medical historian who was the founding director of the Office of NIH History and the Stetten Museum at the National Institutes of Health. Most known for organizing conferences and publishing works on the history of HIV/AIDS, Harden also authored books on the history of the NIH and Rocky Mountain spotted fever. She is a past president of the Society for History in the Federal Government.

Education 
Harden completed a B.A. in American history at Emory University in 1966.> She finished a M.A. at University of Florida in 1968. Harden earned a Ph.D. in American history at Emory University in 1983. Her doctoral advisor was James Harvey Young. She conducted much of her dissertation research as a fellow at the National Museum of American History. During a post-doctoral year at the Institute for the History of Medicine of Johns Hopkins School of Medicine, she was supported by a grant from the United States National Library of Medicine and completed work on Inventing the NIH: Federal Biomedical Research Policy, 1887-1937 (1986).

Career 
From 1984-1986 Harden was on the staff of the National Institute of Allergy and Infectious Diseases (NIAID), researching and writing Rocky Mountain Spotted Fever: History of a Twentieth-Century Disease (1990). It won the 1991 Henry Adams prize of the Society for History in the Federal Government for the best book published in 1990 about the history of the federal government. In 1989 and 1993 Harden organized conferences on the history of AIDS. The proceedings were published as AIDS and the Historian (1991) and AIDS and the Public Debate: Historical and Contemporary Perspectives (1995). In June 2001, she launched a website commemorating the twentieth anniversary of the first publication about AIDS: In Their Own Words: NIH Researchers Recall the Early Years of AIDS. During the 1986-87 observance of the National Institutes of Health (NIH) centennial, Harden oversaw the creation and development of the Stetten Museum at the National Institutes of Health (NIH) and the Office of NIH History. She served as its director until her retirement in 2006. Harden continues to serve the office as a special volunteer.

Harden has served on the executive councils of the American Historical Association and the American Association for the History of Medicine. In 1993-94, she served as president of the Washington Society for the History of Medicine and in 1998-99 as president of the Society for History in the Federal Government. In 2006, she was awarded the Herbert Feis prize for outstanding contributions to public history by the American Historical Association, and in 2007 the Lifetime Achievement Award of the American Association for the History of Medicine.

In 2012, Harden published AIDS at 30: A History, an overview of the epidemic emphasizing the response of the medical community—physicians and nurses, public health officials, and biomedical researchers—to AIDS.

Selected works

Books

Edited volumes

Journal articles

References

External links
 
 

Year of birth missing (living people)
Place of birth missing (living people)
American women historians
20th-century American historians
21st-century American historians
20th-century American women writers
21st-century American women writers
American medical historians
Women medical writers
National Institutes of Health people
Emory University alumni
History of HIV/AIDS
University of Florida alumni